Onoba semicostata is a species of minute sea snail, a marine gastropod mollusk or micromollusk in the family Rissoidae.

Classification
Turbo semicostatus Montagu, 1803 is probably another species than those which is mostly understand by that name. According to Warén Turbo shepeianus could be the valid name for this species found off Belgium. Further research is necessary, therefore we use the more commonly used name Onoba semicostata.

Taxonomy
Janssen (1975) mentioned two subspecies: O. s. semicostata and O. s. aculeus (Gould, 1841). Thorson (1941), Warén (1973, 1974) and Fretter & Graham (1978) are followed who both consider O. s. semicostata and O. s. aculeus as separate species.

Description

Distribution
This marine species occurs in the Baltic Sea, the North Sea, the Northern and Northeast Atlantic Ocean and in the Mediterranean Sea.

References

 Montagu, G. (1803) Testacea Britannica or Natural History of British Shells, Marine, Land, and Fresh-water, Including the Most Minute: Systematically Arranged and Embellished with Figures. J. White, London, Vol. 1, xxxvii + 291 pp. and Vol. 2, 293–606 pp.
 Ziegelmeier, E. (1966). Die Schnecken (Gastropoda Prosobranchia) der deutsche Meeresgebiete und brackigen Küstengewässer [The Gastropoda Prosobranchia from the German seas and brackish coastal waters]. Helgol. Wiss. Meeresunters. 13: 1-66 
 Gofas, S.; Le Renard, J.; Bouchet, P. (2001). Mollusca, in: Costello, M.J. et al. (Ed.) (2001). European register of marine species: a check-list of the marine species in Europe and a bibliography of guides to their identification. Collection Patrimoines Naturels, 50: pp. 180–213

External links

Rissoidae
Gastropods described in 1803